Canoe sprint is a water sport in which athletes race canoes or kayaks on calm water.

Overview
Race categories vary by the number of athletes in the boat, the length of the course, and whether the boat is a canoe or kayak. Canoe sprints are sometimes referred to as flat water racing. The distances recognized by the ICF for international canoe sprint races are 200m, 500m, and 1000m. These races take place on straight courses with each boat paddling in its own designated lane. Longer marathon races do exist, notably the 5000m (also an ICF-recognized distance) – these usually have athletes starting in a large pack at a start line before paddling around a set course with marked turning points (there are no assigned lanes). For each race a number of heats, semi-finals and a final may be necessary, depending on the number of competitors.

The sport is governed by the International Canoe Federation. The International Canoe Federation is the worldwide canoeing organization and creates the standard rules for the different disciplines of canoe/kayak competition. The ICF recognizes several competitive and non-competitive disciplines of canoeing, of which Sprint and Slalom are the only two competing in the Olympic games.

On the whole, Europe has dominated the sport, winning over 90% of all available medals.

The official boats recognized by the ICF as 'International Boats' are: K1, K2, K4, C1, C2 and C4, where the number indicates the number of paddlers, “K” stands for kayak and “C” for canoe. The ICF rules for these boats define, among others, the maximum length, the minimum weight and the shape of the boats – for instance, a K1 must be 520 cm long and weighs at least 8 kg for marathons or 12 kg for sprints. Originally, width (beam) restrictions were also enforced; these were revoked in 2000, spurring a flurry of innovations in boat designs. Modern boats are usually made of carbon fiber, aramid fiber (e.g., Kevlar) with epoxy resin, or variants of high-performance fiber-glass.

Kayak

In a kayak, the paddler is seated in the direction of travel, and uses a double-bladed paddle. Kayaks have a rudder for steering and course adjustment, which is operated by the feet of the paddler in the front. The paddle used is usually a 'wing paddle' (although standard asymmetrical paddles can also be used) – wing paddles have blades which are shaped to resemble a wing or spoon, creating lift and increasing the power and stability of the stroke. There are many variations of wing paddles, ranging from longer and narrower options for more stability throughout the entire stroke to more extreme 'teardrop' shaped paddles for a firmer application of power at the start of the stroke.

Canoe
 
In a canoe the paddler kneels on one knee with the other leg forward and foot flat on the floor of the boat, and paddles a single-bladed paddle on one side only with what is known as a 'J-stroke' to control the boat's direction. In Canada, a racing class exists for the C-15 or WC or "War Canoe", as well as a similarly designed C-4 (which is much shorter and more squat than an 'International' C-4). An antiquated boat class is the C-7, resembling a large C4 which was debuted by the ICF with little success. For racing canoes, the blade is typically short and broad, with a 'power face' on one side that is either flat or scalloped out.  The shaft will typically be longer than a tripping canoe paddle, because the kneeling position puts the paddler higher above the surface of the water. More recent designs of canoe racing paddles often have a slight bent shaft, commonly 12–14 degrees. (a concept of canoe designer Eugene Jensen in the 1960s).  Many high-performance canoe paddlers prefer the feel of a wooden handle with a carbon fiber shaft and blade, while nearly all high-performance kayak paddlers use paddles made completely of carbon fiber.

Gallery

References 

 
Canoeing disciplines
Summer Olympic disciplines
Canoe racing